USA-79, also known as GPS IIA-3, GPS II-12 and GPS SVN-25, was an American navigation satellite which formed part of the Global Positioning System. It was the third of nineteen Block IIA GPS satellites to be launched.

Background 
Global Positioning System (GPS) was developed by the U.S. Department of Defense to provide all-weather round-the-clock navigation capabilities for military ground, sea, and air forces. Since its implementation, GPS has also become an integral asset in numerous civilian applications and industries around the globe, including recreational used (e.g., boating, aircraft, hiking), corporate vehicle fleet tracking, and surveying. GPS employs 24 spacecraft in 20,200 km circular orbits inclined at 55.0°. These vehicles are placed in 6 orbit planes with four operational satellites in each plane.

GPS Block 2 was the operational system, following the demonstration system composed of Block 1 (Navstar 1 - 11) spacecraft. These spacecraft were 3-axis stabilized, nadir pointing using reaction wheels. Dual solar arrays supplied 710 watts of power. They used S-band (SGLS) communications for control and telemetry and Ultra high frequency (UHF) cross-link between spacecraft. The payload consisted of two L-band navigation signals at 1575.42 MHz (L1) and 1227.60 MHz (L2). Each spacecraft carried 2 rubidium and 2 Cesium clocks and nuclear detonation detection sensors. Built by Rockwell Space Systems for the U.S. Air force, the spacecraft measured 5.3 m across with solar panels deployed and had a design life of 7.5 years.

Launch 
USA-79 was launched at 22:29:00 UTC on 23 February 1992, atop a Delta II launch vehicle, flight number D207, flying in the 7925-9.5 configuration. The launch took place from Launch Complex 17B (LC-17B) at the Cape Canaveral Air Force Station (CCAFS), and placed USA-79 into a transfer orbit. The satellite raised itself into medium Earth orbit using a Star-37XFP apogee motor.

Mission 
It had PRN 25, and operated in slot 2 of plane A of the GPS constellation. It had a design life of 7.5 years, and ceased operations on 18 December 2009.

References 

Spacecraft launched in 1992
GPS satellites
USA satellites